The 1983 Stanford Cardinal football team represented Stanford University in the Pacific-10 Conference (Pac-10) during the 1983 NCAA Division I-A football season and played home games on campus at Stanford Stadium in Stanford, California. Led by alumnus Paul Wiggin, in his fourth and final season as head coach, the Cardinal won only one game, the program's worst record since going winless in 1960. He was fired on November 11, but was allowed to finish out the season. 

Stanford struggled on offense behind true freshman quarterback John Paye. Previous QB John Elway, a four-year starter, was the first selection of the 1983 NFL Draft and started as a rookie for the Denver Broncos.

After the season in December, Jack Elway was hired from nearby San Jose State, where he went   in five seasons. His Spartans had defeated Stanford the previous three years, the first two while his son John was the Cardinal quarterback.

Schedule

References

Stanford
Stanford Cardinal football seasons
Stanford Cardinal football